The aryl hydrocarbon receptor (also known as AhR, AHR, ahr, ahR, AH receptor, or dioxin receptor) is a protein that in humans is encoded by the AHR gene. The aryl hydrocarbon receptor is a transcription factor that regulates gene expression. It was originally thought to function primarily as a sensor of xenobiotic chemicals and also as the regulator of enzymes such as cytochrome P450s that metabolize these chemicals.  The most notable of these xenobiotic chemicals are aromatic (aryl) hydrocarbons from which the receptor derives its name.

More recently, it has been discovered that AhR is activated (or deactivated) by a number of endogenous indole derivatives such as kynurenine.  In addition to regulating metabolism enzymes, the AhR has roles in regulating immunity, stem cell maintenance, and cellular differentiation.

The aryl hydrocarbon receptor is a member of the family of basic helix-loop-helix transcription factors.  AHR binds several exogenous ligands such as natural plant flavonoids, polyphenolics and indoles, as well as synthetic polycyclic aromatic hydrocarbons and dioxin-like compounds. AhR is a cytosolic transcription factor that is normally inactive, bound to several co-chaperones. Upon ligand binding to chemicals such as 2,3,7,8-tetrachlorodibenzo-p-dioxin (TCDD), the chaperones dissociate resulting in AhR translocating into the nucleus and dimerizing with ARNT (AhR nuclear translocator), leading to changes in gene transcription.

Protein functional domains

The AhR protein contains several domains critical for function and is classified as a member of the basic helix-loop-helix/Per-Arnt-Sim (bHLH/PAS) family of transcription factors. The bHLH motif is located in the N-terminal of the protein and is a common entity in a variety of transcription factors. Members of the bHLH superfamily have two functionally distinctive and highly conserved domains. The first is the basic-region (b), which is involved in the binding of the transcription factor to DNA. The second is the helix-loop-helix (HLH) region, which facilitates protein-protein interactions. Also contained with the AhR are two PAS domains, PAS-A and PAS-B, which are stretches of 200-350 amino acids that exhibit a high sequence homology to the protein domains that were originally found in the Drosophila genes period (Per) and single-minded (Sim) and in AhR's dimerization partner the aryl hydrocarbon receptor nuclear translocator (ARNT). The PAS domains support specific secondary interactions with other PAS domain containing proteins, as is the case with AhR and ARNT, so that dimeric and heteromeric protein complexes can form. The ligand binding site of AhR is contained within the PAS-B domain and contains several conserved residues critical for ligand binding. Finally, a glutamine-rich (Q-rich) domain is located in the C-terminal region of the protein and is involved in co-activator recruitment and transactivation.

Ligands
AhR ligands have been generally classified into two categories, synthetic or naturally occurring. The first ligands to be discovered were synthetic and members of the halogenated aromatic hydrocarbons (polychlorinated dibenzodioxins, dibenzofurans and biphenyls) and polycyclic aromatic hydrocarbons (3-methylcholanthrene, benzo[a]pyrene, benzanthracenes and benzoflavones). A range of synthetic ligands have been designed to target the possible future treatment of breast cancer.

Research has focused on naturally occurring compounds with the hope of identifying an endogenous ligand. Naturally occurring compounds that have been identified as ligands of Ahr include derivatives of tryptophan such as indigo dye and indirubin, tetrapyrroles such as bilirubin, the arachidonic acid metabolites lipoxin A4 and prostaglandin G, modified low-density lipoprotein and several dietary carotenoids. One assumption made in the search for an endogenous ligand is that the ligand will be a receptor agonist. However, work by Savouret et al. has shown this may not be the case since their findings demonstrate that 7-ketocholesterol competitively inhibits Ahr signal transduction.

Carbidopa is a selective aryl hydrocarbon receptor modulator (SAhRM). Other SAhRMs include microbial-derived 1,4-dihydroxy-2-napthoic acid and plant-derived 3,3-diindolylmethane.

Indolocarbazole (ICZ) is one of the strongest non-halogenated agonists for AHR in vitro reported.

Signaling pathway

Cytosolic complex
Non-ligand bound Ahr is retained in the cytoplasm as an inactive protein complex consisting of a dimer of Hsp90, prostaglandin E synthase 3 (PTGES3, p23) and a single molecule of the immunophilin-like AH receptor-interacting protein, also known as hepatitis B virus X-associated protein 2 (XAP2), AhR interacting protein (AIP), and AhR-activated 9 (ARA9). The dimer of Hsp90, along with PTGES3 (p23), has a multifunctional role in the protection of the receptor from proteolysis, constraining the receptor in a conformation receptive to ligand binding and preventing the premature binding of ARNT. AIP interacts with carboxyl-terminal of Hsp90 and binds to the AhR nuclear localization sequence (NLS) preventing the inappropriate trafficking of the receptor into the nucleus.

Receptor activation
Upon ligand binding to AhR, AIP is released resulting in exposure of the NLS, which is located in the bHLH region, leading to import into the nucleus. It is presumed that once in the nucleus, Hsp90 dissociates exposing the two PAS domains allowing the binding of ARNT. The activated AhR/ARNT heterodimer complex is then capable of either directly or indirectly interacting with DNA by binding to recognition sequences located in the 5’- regulatory region of dioxin-responsive genes.

DNA binding (xenobiotic response element – XRE)
The classical recognition motif of the AhR/ARNT complex, referred to as either the AhR-, dioxin- or xenobiotic- responsive element (AHRE, DRE or XRE), contains the core sequence 5'-GCGTG-3' within the consensus sequence 5'-T/GNGCGTGA/CG/CA-3' in the promoter region of AhR responsive genes. The AhR/ARNT heterodimer directly binds the AHRE/DRE/XRE core sequence in an asymmetric manner such that ARNT binds to 5'-GTG-3' and AhR binding 5'-TC/TGC-3'. Recent research suggests that a second type of element termed AHRE-II, 5'-CATG(N6)C[T/A]TG-3', is capable of indirectly acting with the AhR/ARNT complex. Regardless of the response element, the result is a variety of differential changes in gene expression.

Functional role in physiology and toxicology

Role in development
In terms of evolution, the oldest physiological role of AhR is in development. AhR is presumed to have evolved from invertebrates where it served a ligand-independent role in normal development processes. The AhR homolog in Drosophila, spineless (ss) is necessary for development of the distal segments of the antenna and leg. Ss dimerizes with tango (tgo), which is the homolog to the mammalian Arnt, to initiate gene transcription. Evolution of the receptor in vertebrates resulted in the ability to bind ligand and might have helped humans evolve to tolerate smoke of fires. In developing vertebrates, AhR seemingly plays a role in cellular proliferation and differentiation. Despite lacking a clear endogenous ligand, AhR appears to play a role in the differentiation of many developmental pathways, including hematopoiesis, lymphoid systems, T-cells, neurons, and hepatocytes. AhR has also been found to have an important function in hematopoietic stem cells: AhR antagonism promotes their self-renewal and ex-vivo expansion and is involved in megakaryocyte differentiation. In adulthood, signaling is associated with the stress response and mutations in AhR are associated with major depressive disorder.

Adaptive and innate response
The adaptive response is manifested as the induction of xenobiotic metabolizing enzymes. Evidence of this response was first observed from the induction of cytochrome P450, family 1, subfamily A, polypeptide 1 (Cyp1a1) resultant from TCDD exposure, which was determined to be directly related to activation of the Ahr signaling pathway.  The search for other metabolizing genes induced by AhR ligands, due to the presence of DREs, has led to the identification of an "AhR gene battery" of Phase I and Phase II metabolizing enzymes consisting of CYP1A1, CYP1A2, CYP1B1, NQO1, ALDH3A1, UGT1A2 and GSTA1. Presumably, vertebrates have this function to be able to detect a wide range of chemicals, indicated by the wide range of substrates AhR is able to bind and facilitate their biotransformation and elimination. The AhR may also signal the presence of toxic chemicals in food and cause aversion of such foods.

AhR activation seems to be also important for immunological responses and inhibiting inflammation through upregulation of interleukin 22 and downregulation of Th17 response.
The Knockdown of AHR mostly downregulates the expression of innate immunity genes in THP-1 cells.

Toxic response
Extensions of the adaptive response are the toxic responses elicited by AhR activation. Toxicity results from two different ways of AhR signaling. The first is a side effect of the adaptive response in which the induction of metabolizing enzymes results in the production of toxic metabolites. For example, the polycyclic aromatic hydrocarbon benzo[a]pyrene (BaP), a ligand for AhR, induces its own metabolism and bioactivation to a toxic metabolite via the induction of CYP1A1 and CYP1B1 in several tissues. The second approach to toxicity is the result of aberrant changes in global gene transcription beyond those observed in the "AhR gene battery." These global changes in gene expression lead to adverse changes in cellular processes and function. Microarray analysis has proved most beneficial in understanding and characterizing this response.

Protein-protein interactions
In addition to the protein interactions mentioned above, AhR has also been shown to interact with the following:

AIP
 ARNTL
 CCNT1
 ESR1
 NCOA1 
 NEDD8 
 NRIP1 
 RELA 
 RELB
 RP

References

External links 
 
 
 

Receptors
Transcription factors
PAS-domain-containing proteins